Laugardalshöll (also known as Laugardalshöllin  and Laugardalsholl Sport Center) is a multi-purpose sports and exhibition venue located in the Laugardalur district of Iceland's capital Reykjavík. The complex consists of two main venues, a sports hall and indoor arena for track and field athletics events.

Opened on 4 December 1965, it hosts a variety of sporting events, such as handball, basketball, volleyball and athletics, as well as various other events as a general purpose venue. The capacity of the main hall, Laugardalshöllin, is up to 5,500 people for sports and around 3,000 seated (or 5,000 standing) for concerts. It is the home arena to the Icelandic national teams (both male and female) in basketball and handball.

It was the largest concert venue in Iceland for many decades (before the opening of Egilshöll), with a maximum standing capacity of 10,000 (or 5,000 seated) in Frjálsíþróttahöllin, the adjoined athletics center.

History

Construction and opening
Construction of the building originally started on 29 August 1959 but was largely haulted shortly afterwards due to lack of funds. Following a new tender process in Spring 1961, work resumed in August that year but was again stopped this time due to strikes by various unions. The arena's roof vault was eventually cast over four days in September 1963 and the venue was finally completed on opening day in 1965. The first event held in the arena, a handball match, took place on Saturday 4 December 1965 between the Reykjavík team and the Czech team HCB Karviná, who came to Iceland at the invitation of sports club Knattspyrnufélagið Fram.

Later expansions
The first extension was built on the east side of the building to increase the number of spectator seats for the 1995 World Men's Handball Championship. After the tournament, the extension was converted into a small gym for basketball but now houses conference and storage rooms.

In September 2004, it was announced that a 7,000 m2 extension would be built next to Laugardalshöllin designed specifically for athletics but can also host other events. Opened in November 2005, the venue includes a 200-meter running track. At the same time, maintenance and renovations also took place in the main arena's building which reopened in early September 2005 after being closed during the summer months.

Proposal for new venue
In 2017, the ÍBR Congress agreed to launch a feasibility study on the construction of a new multi-purpose sports hall, but this was rejected for cost reasons. It has been pointed out that the Laugardalshöllin does not meet modern sports standards and is in fact "obsolete and illegal" for international handball and basketball competitions but are played in the hall due to an exemption from international federations.

In January 2020 Lilja Dögg Alfreðsdóttir, Minister of Education, Science and Culture, appointed a working group to make proposals for a new "national stadium for indoor sports". Initial proposals were expected to be submitted before May of that year. In April 2022, a committee concluded that a new venue should have either a seated capacity of 5,000 or 8,600 (expandable up to 12,000 for concerts), which would satisfy the requirements needed for handball and basketball. The smaller venue would cost 7.9 billion ISK, while the larger one would cost 8.7 billion ISK. The new arena would be concurrent with Norway's Trondheim Spektrum. The city has reserved 2 billion ISK for the project. In May, the city and the government agreed to making a stadium for the national teams that would be shared with sports clubs Þróttur and Ármann as-well as the schools in the neighbourhood. The city would cover cost equal to the needs of the schools and sports clubs and the government covers cost of any additional facilities needed by the national teams. A construction committee will handle the project, ask for designs and the stadium is expected to be fully constructed by 2025.

Events

Perhaps the most prominent event to be held at Laugardalshöll was the World Chess Championship 1972, often dubbed the "Match of the Century", in which challenger Bobby Fischer of the United States defeated the defending champion Boris Spassky of the Soviet Union. The movie Bobby Fischer Against the World (2011) features scenes from Laugardalshöll.

The arena hosted the 1995 World Men's Handball Championship and many matches of the Iceland men's national handball team, one of the most successful sports of the country.

On 14 November 2009, the "National Assembly", the first step of a constitutional reform process, was held here. It gathered 1500 citizens, of which 1200 were randomly picked from the national register. It produced a document listing the main principles of the island nation.

From 2007 to 2011, it also hosted CCP Games' EVE Online annual 'Fanfest'. The event returned in 2022.

Every year since 2016, the arena has held the finals of Söngvakeppnin, the Icelandic preliminary round for the Eurovision Song Contest.

In 2021, it hosted Riot Games' League of Legends Mid-Season Invitational and Valorant Masters from 6 May to 30 May. The arena also hosted the 2021 League of Legends World Championship from 5 October to 6 November.

See also
 List of indoor arenas in Nordic countries

References

External links

 

Handball venues in Iceland
Indoor arenas in Iceland
Sports venues in Reykjavík
Basketball venues in Iceland
Volleyball venues in Iceland
Indoor track and field venues
1965 establishments in Iceland
Sports venues completed in 1965
Music venues completed in 1965